Maoritrechus is a genus of beetles in the family Carabidae, containing the following species:

 Maoritrechus nunni Townsend, 2010
 Maoritrechus rangitotoensis Brookes, 1932
 Maoritrechus stewartensis Townsend, 2010

References

Trechinae